Dato Sri Haji Fadillah bin Haji Yusof (Jawi: فضيلة بن يوسف; born 17 April 1962) is a Malaysian politician and lawyer currently serving as Deputy Prime Minister of Malaysia, and Minister of Plantation and Commodities since 2022. He has been the Member of Parliament (MP) for Petra Jaya since March 2004. He is the first DPM from Sarawak, one of the Borneo states in Malaysia and the second DPM not from the United Malays National Organisation (UMNO) after Wan Azizah Wan Ismail from the People's Justice Party (PKR).

Previously, he served as Senior Minister in charge of Works and Minister of Works for the third term in the Barisan Nasional (BN) administration under former Prime Minister Ismail Sabri Yaakob from August 2021 to the collapse of the BN administration in November 2022 and the Member of Parliament (MP) for Petra Jaya since March 2004. He served as the Senior Minister in charge of Infrastructure Development and Minister of Works for the second term in the PN administration under former Prime Minister Muhyiddin Yassin from March 2020 to August 2021 and for the first term in Barisan Nasional (BN) administration under former Prime Minister Najib Razak from May 2013 to May 2018,  Chair of the Science, Innovation and Environment Select Committee, one of only two select committees led by an opposition MP from December 2019 to his reappointment as a Minister in March 2020. 

Fadillah is a member of Parti Pesaka Bumiputera Bersatu (PBB), a component party of the Gabungan Parti Sarawak (GPS) coalition.  He is also the Parliamentary Whip of GPS and has served as Senior Vice President of PBB since 2017. He was the Youth Chief of PBB from 2007 to 2017.

Early life and education 
Fadillah was born on 17 April 1962 to Yusof Merais and Dayang Rosnah Abang Madeli. He is the ninth child of 14 siblings. Fadillah's father, Yusof Merais, was a community activist during the era of the anti-cession of Sarawak to the British colonials in 1946. He was imprisoned twice, including when he was implicated in the assassination of British Governor Duncan Stewart in Sibu in 1949. He was a friend of Rosli Dhobi, who assassinated Stewart. Yusof had participated in the Malay Youth Movement, which opposed the handover of Sarawak to the British, and he was also involved in the Black Crow group that opposed the colonial presence and demanded Sarawakian independence. After the movement was banned following the assassination of Stewart, he continued the struggle with the Sarawkian Youth Front, led by Ahmad Zaidi Adruce. The second time he was imprisoned was during the confrontation over the formation of Malaysia in 1962. Yusof died at the age of 91 in 2018.

Fadillah attended St. Mary's Primary School in Sibu and Panglima Bukit Gantang Secondary School in Parit Buntar for his secondary education. In 1986, he pursued a Bachelor of Laws (LLB) degree in Civil and Sharia at University of Malaya.

Early career 
Fadillah became a lawyer after obtaining a LLB. In 1989, he joined politics as a member of Parti Pesaka Bumiputera Bersatu (PBB), which at that time was a component party of Barisan Nasional (BN) coalition.

Political career 
Fadillah first ran for parliament in the 11th Malaysian general election, having previously been an official in Parti Pesaka Bumiputera Bersatu (PBB) and a lawyer. He won the election for the seat of Petra Jaya.

After being re-elected in the 12th Malaysian general election, Fadillah was appointed Deputy Minister for Science, Technology and Innovation by Prime Minister Abdullah Ahmad Badawi.

After the 13th Malaysian general election, Fadillah was promoted to full minister as Minister of Works under the new Cabinet line-up of Prime Minister Najib Razak.

Following the defeat of Barisan Nasional (BN) in the 14th Malaysian general election, Fadillah was made chief whip of the opposition Sarawak Parties Alliance (GPS) in the House of Representatives of Malaysia.

Deputy Prime Minister 
In the 2022 general election, Fadillah managed to retain his seat this time with a larger majority. After the elections, no party obtained a majority to form the government at the federal level, so the Yang di-Pertuan Agong suggested that a unity government be formed, and eventually Anwar Ibrahim was appointed to lead it on 24 November 2022. In a cabinet announcement on 2 December 2022, Fadillah was appointed Deputy Prime Minister together with Ahmad Zahid Hamidi. At the same time, he was appointed Minister of Plantation and Commodities.

Fadillah is the first person from Sarawak to hold the country's second highest political post since the formation of Malaysia, making his appointment to the office a historic one. Sarawak is one of the East Malaysian states.

Personal life 
Fadillah married Ruziah Mohd Tahir. The couple has five children.

Election results

Honours

Honours of Malaysia
  :
  Commander of the Order of the Star of Hornbill Sarawak (PGBK) – Datuk (2010)
  Knight Commander of the Order of the Star of Sarawak (PNBS) – Dato Sri (2022)
  :
  Grand Knight of the Order of Sultan Ahmad Shah of Pahang (SSAP) – Dato' Sri (2013)
  :
  Grand Commander of the Exalted Order of Malacca (DGSM) – Datuk Seri (2014)

Notes

References

External links 
 Fadillah Yusof on Facebook

|-

|}

1962 births
Living people
20th-century Malaysian lawyers
21st-century Malaysian politicians
Commanders of the Order of the Star of Hornbill Sarawak
Deputy Prime Ministers of Malaysia
Government ministers of Malaysia
Knights Commander of the Most Exalted Order of the Star of Sarawak
Malaysian Muslims
Malaysian people of Malay descent
Members of the Dewan Rakyat
Parti Pesaka Bumiputera Bersatu politicians
People from Sarawak
University of Malaya alumni